Glycoluril is an organic chemical composed of two cyclic urea groups joined across the same two-carbon chain. It is a white powder that has been used in water treatment, in paints and coatings, and occasionally as a slow-release fertilizer.

Production
Glycoluril can be synthesized by reacting two equivalents of urea with glyoxal. Likewise, using other vicinal carbonyl (or carbonyl hydrate) reactants give derivatives having various functional groups in place of the hydrogen atoms on the carbon chain.

Properties 
The four amide-like and therefore acidic hydrogen atoms of glycoluril are amenable to a variety of chemical reactions, such as substitution with halogen atoms or a reaction with formaldehyde.

Use
Glycouril itself and derivatives of it are used as monomers for producing the macrocyclic cucurbiturils polymers, which serve as hosts to bind to various neutral and cationic species. They are also used in several classes of non-cyclic structures that also bind a variety of structures.

Glycoluril is used as the starting material for tetrachloromoglycoluril and tetrabromoglycoluril, which are used as biocides in water treatment, swimming pool disinfection, and as sludge control agents in papermaking.

The use of glycoluril as a sustained-release nitrogen fertilizer has been discussed, but it has not been widely used because of its high cost.

Glycoluril can be converted with excess methanal into tetramethylol glycoluril, which releases methanal with delay and is therefore used as a biocide in water-based paints, in liquid detergents and in care and cleaning agents (in concentrations of 0.1%). It also finds utility as a crosslinker for hydroxyl-containing polymers, as an industrial fungicide and as an accelerator in cements.

Tetraacetylglycoluril (TAGU) can be prepared from glycoluril by reaction with acetic anhydride. Tetraacetylglycoluril can be used, but it not very common as a bleach activator for sodium percarbonate in solid detergent formulations because of its slow biodegradability.

The reaction with nitrating acid (concentrated nitric acid and concentrated sulfuric acid) leads to the explosives dinitroglycoluril and  tetranitroglycoluril.

References 

Nitrogen heterocycles
Monomers